Minolia pompiliodes is a species of sea snail, a marine gastropod mollusk in the family Solariellidae.

Description
The height of the shell attains 6 mm, its diameter 9 mm. The shell has a conical and depressed shape. It has five whorls. The outer lip is thin. The columellar margin is reflected at the angle near the umbilicus.

This is a most beautiful species, smooth, shining, ornamented with a beautiful regular series of white spots upon a bright fawn-coloured ground. At the periphery, which is not angled, the shell is whitish, with another line of zigzagged pale-brown markings more flame-shaped at the base. Around the deep umbilicus, the margin of which is very slightly angled, a row of dark-brown flames alternates with the white. The interior of the almost round aperture is smooth and beautifully margaritaceous.

Distribution
The marine species occurs off the Philippines.

References

pompiliodes
Gastropods described in 1891